Andrew Mozina (born July 7, 1963) is an American writer.

Biography
Mozina grew up in Brookfield, Wisconsin, a suburb of Milwaukee. He is a graduate of Pius XI High School in Milwaukee, Wisconsin, and received a B.A. in Economics from Northwestern University, where he was President of the Associated Student Government as a member of the "Silly Party."  He attended law school for a year, then earned a master’s degree in creative writing from Boston University and moved to St. Louis where he completed a doctorate in English literature at Washington University. He is an associate professor of English, teaching literature and creative writing, at Kalamazoo College, in Michigan.

Works
Mozina's  books include the short story collections, The Women Were Leaving the Men (Wayne State University Press, 2007), and  Quality Snacks (Wayne State University Press, 2014), and the novel Contrary Motion (Spiegel & Grau, 2016).  The Women Were Leaving the Men was a finalist in the Mary McCarthy Prize in Short Fiction; the collection's title story received a special mention in the Pushcart Prize 2006 and was also listed as a distinguished story in The Best American Short Stories collection of 2005.  Mozina has published a critical work on Joseph Conrad, Joseph Conrad and the Art of Sacrifice (2001).  

In 2014, Mozina performed in a video for Milwaukee power pop band The Mike Benign Compulsion, "Professional Jealousy/Saw Your Post."

References

External links
The Women Were Leaving the Men
Kalamazoo College biography
Official Website

American short story writers
Living people
Kalamazoo College faculty
1963 births